Bruzual is a city in Apure State in Venezuela, and the shire town of Muñoz Municipality. It is named for Manuel Ezequiel Bruzual.

Cities in Apure